Ashley L. Shade is the Director of Research at the Institute of Ecology and the Environment within Le Centre National de la Recherche Scientifique. Shade is an associate professor at Michigan State University in the Department of Microbiology and Molecular Genetics and Department of Plant, Soil and Microbial Sciences. She is best known for her work in microbial ecology and plant-microbe interactions.

Education 
Shade received her Bachelor of Science degree in biology from Susquehanna University. She received her Ph.D. from the University of Wisconsin-Madison under the supervision of Katherine D. McMahon. Her dissertation was on the disturbance ecology of freshwater microbial communities in vertically stratified lakes that experience lake turnover. Shade did her post-doctoral work at Yale University under Jo Handelsman as a Gordon and Betty Moore Foundation Scholar in the Life Sciences Research Foundation.

Career and research 
After completing her post-doctoral research at Yale, Shade moved to Michigan State University in 2014. Shade began her time and her research group at Michigan State University as an assistant professor in the Department of Microbiology and Molecular Genetics. In 2017, she began teaching in the Department of Plant, Soil, and Microbial Sciences in addition to her home department of Microbiology and Molecular Genetics. In 2021, Shade was promoted to associate professor. In her career, Shade has promoted the importance of data accessibility, reproducibility, and diversity, equity, and inclusion.

Shade has contributed in the fields of microbial ecology and plant-microbe interactions. For example, The Earth Microbiome Project works to collect and analyze microbial samples across the globe. These contributions have contributed to the general understanding of resilience in freshwater communities, including soil and plants.

Shade's Lab focuses on microbial ecology and plant-microbe interactions by using Omics approaches to evaluate microbiomes. The lab is part of The BioMolecular Sciences Graduate Training Program, The Plant Resilience Institute, The Great Lakes Bioenergy Research Center, and The Ecology, Evolutionary Biology, and Behavior programs at Michigan State University. The lab has three main areas of research including extremophile microbiome resilience, chemical interactions in microbial communities, and plant-microbe interactions to promote resilience.

In 2022, Shade moved to France to join the Centre national de la Recherche Scientifique as a director of research. There, she is working on how to increase the resilience of agricultural systems, including crops and soils, by maintaining microbial functions despite changing environmental conditions due to climate change.

Shade is a senior editor for the American Society for Microbiology's journal mSystems and is a guest editor for Phytobiomes Journal.

Selected awards and recognition 

 2010–2013: Life Sciences Research Foundation Post-doctoral Fellow of the Gordon and Betty Moore Foundation
 2009: University of Wisconsin-Madison Department of Bacteriology: Ira L. Baldwin Distinguished Predoctoral Fellowship for Excellence in Research
 2008: University of Wisconsin-Madison Anna Grant Birge Award for Limnology Field Work

Selected publications

References 

Living people
Wikipedia Student Program
University of Wisconsin–Madison alumni
Place of birth missing (living people)
Date of birth missing (living people)
21st-century American scientists
21st-century American women scientists
American women biologists
Women microbiologists
French National Centre for Scientific Research scientists
American microbiologists
Year of birth missing (living people)